Sesame Street is an American children's television series.

Sesame Street may also refer to:

Sesame Street (fictional location), a fictional street in Manhattan
Sesame Street (comic strip), a comic strip based on the television series

See also
Sesame Street characters, a list of Sesame Street characters
Sesame Street in Japan
Sesame Street in the United Kingdom
Sesame Street video games, a list of video games from the series
Sesame Street discography
The Sesame Street Dictionary